SSAU may refer to:

Samara State Aerospace University, a Russian engineering and technical institution
State Space Agency of Ukraine
Saratov State Agrarian University, an agricultural higher education institution in the Volga region.